South Ukrainian National Pedagogical University named after K. D. Ushinsky is a public university in the large city of Odesa. Founded in 1817, SUNPU is one of the oldest educational institutions of Ukraine and the first teaching one on the northern Black Sea coast.

South Ukrainian National Pedagogical University named after K. D. Ushinsky was established as Pedagogical Institute at Richelieu Lyceum in Odesa on 2 May 1817. It is regarded one of the oldest & most influential pedagogical university of Ukraine.

History 
The University started as a Pedagogical Institute which was established pursuant to the Decree of the Emperor Alexander I in Odesa on 2 May 1817, as a separate structural unit at the Richelieu Lyceum.

During its 200-year history the University has undergone numerous changes of names (the Institute of Teachers, the Institute of People's Education, Odesa State Pedagogical Institute named after K. D. Ushinsky, South Ukrainian State Pedagogical University named after K. D. Ushinsky, South Ukrainian national pedagogical university named after K. Ushinsky), liquidations and updates.

Before 1941 the Institute used to be one of the largest in the city by the number of enrolled students. However, during World War II the Institute was evacuated. It was relocated to the city of Bayram-Ali in the Turkmen SSR, where it functioned until 1944.

Fifteen hundred students and teachers went to the front, almost seven hundred of which were killed.

For outstanding achievements in the training of teaching staff in 1945 by the Resolution of the Government of Ukraine the Institute was given the name of the outstanding scientist and teacher – Konstantin Ushinsky.

In 1970 Odesa State Pedagogical Institute named after K. Ushinsky was awarded a diploma of the Presidium of the Supreme Soviet of the Ukrainian Soviet Socialist Republic.

On 29 September 1994, the Cabinet of Ministers of Ukraine on the basis of  Odesa State Pedagogical Institute named after K. D. Ushinsky created South Ukrainian State Pedagogical University named after K. D. Ushinsky.

In 2007, the staff of the University was awarded by the Cabinet of Ministers of Ukraine for the contribution to the development of education, training highly qualified specialists, productive scientific and pedagogical activity and employment gains.

On 13 July 2009 by the Decree of the President of Ukraine the University granted a national status.

The modern University is the flagship of pedagogical education in the South of Ukraine, where students, post-graduate students and doctors have been successfully training in 47 specialties and specializations.

The  University is composed of 38 departments that are headed by doctors and professors – recognized experts in their fields. About five hundred teachers and twenty foreign specialists work at its departments.

Scientific Work 
There are twelve academicians, seventy professors, doctors of science among the pedagogues; eighteen teachers have an honorary title “Honoured Worker of Science of Ukraine”, “Honoured Worker of Education of Ukraine”, “Honoured Worker of Culture”, “Honoured Artist of Ukraine”, “Honoured Coach of Ukraine” and are the winners of state awards. A lot of University scholars were presented with international awards, elected to be members of national and international academies, societies and associations.

The most important scientific studies at the University were carried out in the framework of seventeen internationally recognized scientific schools.

The results of the University studies are reflected in printed works – more than two thousand scientific papers are annually published at home and foreign editing houses.  Numerous monographs are published in different languages and in    cooperation with the scholars of the US, Israel, China, Great Britain, Lithuania and other countries.

Every year the University supports organizations of more than thirty international and Ukrainian scientific conferences. The University of Ushinsky is a founder of scientific journals in philosophy, political science, sociology, psychology, pedagogy, philology and others.

The University offers seven specialized Doctoral and Candidate Thesis Committees in twelve majors. Each year more than seventy theses are passed. Three hundred Ukrainian and foreign students from fifteen countries take postgraduate and doctorate courses as well as individual academic programs.

Almost three thousand students are involved in scientific work, the results of which are reflected in thousands of articles published every year. The participants of the educational process are winners of almost seventy contests, competitions and various Olympiads of national and international levels.

Ranking & Reputation 
According to SCOPUS database, the University ranks 1st among pedagogical universities of Ukraine. 

The University collaborates with 80 educational and scientific institutions around the world, which makes it an influential university not just in Ukraine but all over the Europe.

There is an International Centre for Distance Learning functioning in association with the University; educational scientific information and culture offices of the State of Israel, the US, Lithuania, China and Korea develop their work under the support of the University.  The establishment is a coordinator of project studies by international programs Tempus, Vyshehrad Fund, the “Ukraine-Norway“ Fund and others).

The University is constantly developing. In recent years there was a significant increase in number of majors and specializations of training graduate, postgraduate and doctoral students. The University has an extensive system of material resources for providing educational process and scientific work. Thus, a modern scientific library was put into operation.

The University provides all necessary conditions for artistic, creative and sports activities of its students who can participate in forty sections and hobby groups.

Significant sporting achievements of the University students and graduates of different years are represented with twenty five Olympic champions, eighty three winners of world and European championships, twenty-eight honoured coaches and masters of sports of Ukraine.

Amateur creative collectives take  part in many prestigious competitions and festivals in Ukraine, Poland, Czech Republic, China,  the United States and other countries where they annually win prizes and get the Grand Prix.

Currently, according to different ratings the University is among the leaders of pedagogical and humanities universities and is presented with high awards, namely those of the Verkhovna Rada of Ukraine, the Cabinet of Ministers of Ukraine, Ministry of Education and Science of Ukraine and others.

Institutes and faculties 
 The Faculty Of Primary Education
The Faculty Of Arts And Graphics
The Faculty Of Music And Choreography
The Faculty Of Physics And Mathematics
The Institute Of Postgraduate Education And Certification
The Institute Of Physical Education, Sports And Rehabilitation
The Faculty Of History And Philology 
The Faculty Of Foreign Languages
The Faculty Of Preschool Pedagogy And Psychology
The Faculty Of Social Studies And Humanities
Medical Faculty

Institute of Medicine 
Medical education at the Institute of Medicine of South Ukrainian National Pedagogical University with its old history, professional teaching staff & advanced educational programs, offers domestic & international students (from above 40 countries) great opportunities from the beginning of their medical career. Leading specialists in separate fields of medical science train the medical students with their theoretical knowledge and invaluable practical experience during the educational process, develop clinical thinking and skills of medical & diagnostic art starting form the first years of studying.

Currently, the University is offering following programs in medical fields

 General Medicine (MD/MBBS)
 Dentistry
 Pharmacy
 Nursing
 Physiotherapy
 Pediatrics
 Psychiatry 
 Orthopaedics (Postgraduate specialization)
 Surgery (Postgraduate specialization)
 Radiology (Postgraduate specialization)
 Neurology (Postgraduate specialization)
 Nephrology (Postgraduate specialization)
 Gynecology (Postgraduate specialization)

And 25+ other postgraduate specialization programs.

Faculty and graduates
Since its establishment the university has trained more than 100,000 specialists for the Ukrainian educational system and thirty other countries. Among its graduates and pedagogues are ministers, deputies of different levels, mayors, heads of large institutions, scientists and educators, directors of research institutes, schools, rectors of higher educational institutions, trainers and masters of sports, winners of Olympiads, recognized artists who made a contribution to the development of education and science worldwide.

Graduates and faculty include twice State prize laureate, founder of new directions in the theory of physics A. Y. Kiv, State prize laureate, founder of theoretical and methodological foundations of modern psychology S. L. Rubinstein, State prize laureate Academician A. M. Bogush, the founder of experimental psychology Professor M. M. Lange and the founders of different scientific schools, which received international recognition – Academicians , O. Ya. Chebykin, O. P. Sannikova, Corresponding Members N. G. Chebotaryov, D. A. Svirenko, R. Yu. Martynova, S. O. Skvortsova; founders of Professional Pedagogy Professor R. I. Hmelyuk, L. I. Fursenko; famous artists: poets –  , A. Sh. Lapynsky, V.  Mykhalchuk,  Ya. Zheleznyak, S. Petrenko, N. Olizarenko, O. Sokolovska, G. Avdyeyenko, M.  Milchev,  Yu. Bilonoh, D. Alekseev, S. Demchuk, Yu. Cheban, V. Lomachenko and others, Hero of Socialist Labour S. Tsvigun, Hero of Ukraine , People's Teacher of the USSR  and more than two thousand distinguished scientists, artists, representatives of people's education.

References

External links
Official Site

 
Educational institutions established in 1817
National universities in Ukraine
Laureates of the Diploma of the Verkhovna Rada of Ukraine
Recipients of the Honorary Diploma of the Cabinet of Ministers of Ukraine
Universities and colleges in Odesa
Teachers colleges
1817 establishments in the Russian Empire